is a 2009 Japanese animated mystery film directed by Masakazu Hashimoto, written by Aya Matsui from a story by Akihiro Hino and produced by P.A. Works and OLM. The film is based on the Professor Layton video game series by Level-5, taking place between the events of the video games Professor Layton and the Last Specter and Professor Layton and the Miracle Mask. In the story, renowned opera star Janice Quatlane contacts her former teacher, Professor Hershel Layton, after encountering a young girl who claims to be the reincarnation of her dead friend. While Layton and his apprentice, Luke Triton, are attending one of Janice's performances, they get unwillingly pulled into a puzzle-themed battle royal where the winner will apparently receive "the gift of eternal life". According to Level-5, the film stays true to the games, with music, puzzles and characters.

An English-language version was released by Manga Entertainment in the United Kingdom on October 18, 2010, around the same time as Professor Layton and the Unwound Future was released, with a British voice cast (including Maria Darling reprising her role of Luke from the UK releases of the games). The film was released in the United States on November 8, 2011 by Viz Media and received generally positive reviews from critics.

Plot
Sometime after the events of the second game of the original trilogy — Professor Layton and the Diabolical Box — archaeologist and puzzle master Professor Hershel Layton and his young apprentice Luke Triton reminisce over one of their earliest adventures together from three years ago (this taking place after Professor Layton and the Last Specter, the first game chronologically): Layton is invited by his former student Janice Quatlane to watch her perform in an opera at the Crown Petone opera house, which is built on the White Cliffs of Dover. The performance centers on the legendary lost Kingdom of Ambrosia and the secret of eternal life it holds, which will be rediscovered when its queen returns. Janice believes recent strange occurrences are somehow connected to the opera: girls have disappeared from London, and the opera's composer, Oswald Whistler, has recently adopted a young girl who has claimed to be his deceased daughter Melina. Whistler plays the entire opera on the Detragon, an elaborate one-man orchestra machine. Once the performance is complete, a mystery man informs the audience that they are to play a game, the winner of which will receive the secret of eternal life, while the losers will die. Several members of the audience try to escape, but the floor opens up beneath them and they disappear. Inspector Grosky tries to arrest the mystery man, but the man is a puppet which inflates and floats out of the theater, taking Grosky with him.

The Crown Petone is revealed to be a ship, which breaks off from the cliffs and sets sail. The mystery man unveils a series of timed puzzles intended to progressively eliminate the players until one winner remains. Layton's prolific puzzle-solving prowess allows him, Luke, Janice, and a group of nine others to quickly deduce the answers. The remaining contestants leave the ship in lifeboats, which takes the players to their next destination as the ship explodes behind them.

The next morning, the group finds themselves on an island. After discovering a sculpted stone seal, amateur historian Marco Brock reasons they must be at Ambrosia. Evading a pack of wolves as they make their way towards the castle at the centre of the island, Layton, Luke and Janice become separated from the rest of the group and assemble a makeshift helicopter that allows them to fly to the castle quickly. There, they solve the fourth and final puzzle that directs them to the final room of the contest, but Layton leaves Luke, Janice and two other contestants (Brock and child prodigy Amelia Ruth) to enter it while he explores the rest of the castle.

Back in London, Emmy Altava, Professor Layton's assistant, is meeting with Dr. Andrew Schrader when she hears about the events on the Crown Petone. She flies out to the remains of the ship, where she picks up Inspector Grosky and flies to the island.

Layton finds a room filled with Melina Whistler's belongings, along with a piece of sheet music titled "A Song of the Sea". He meets Melina herself and witnesses her having an argument with herself. Luke, Janice, Brock and Amelia enter the final room of the contest, only to be trapped behind bars. The mystery man reveals himself as Jean Descole, Layton and Luke's old nemesis, who orders Amelia to be brought to him. Luke, Janice and Brock are taken by Descole's men, but they are saved by Emmy and Grosky. Layton and Melina meet up with them, and Emmy recognizes "Melina" as Nina, one of the girls who went missing.

Amelia is brought to Oswald Whistler, believed to have been eliminated by a previous puzzle, and declares her the winner of the contest, but soon forces her into a machine connected to the Detragon and confesses that there is no Elixir of Life. Layton and company manage to save her, and Layton explains the truth: the Detragon is actually a machine that can copy a person's personality and download their memories into another person's brain. Whistler had conspired with Descole to abduct girls from London and use the Detragon to implant them with his dead daughter's memories as a means of keeping her alive indefinitely. This is the fate that befell Nina, and it is the fate that Whistler had planned for Amelia. Layton reveals that Janice also was a victim of Whistler's experiments, and that, unbeknownst to Whistler, he had actually succeeded in transferring Melina's memories into Janice's body. It was Melina who sought Layton's help in stopping her father from hurting anyone else.

With Melina's cover blown, Descole captures her and reveals his true plan: to use the Detragon in concert with Melina's singing to raise Ambrosia by playing a pair of melodies found in the island's stone seal - the Song of the Stars and the Song of the Sea. After Descole's attempts fail, he flies into a rage: the Detragon destroys the castle and becomes the controls of a gigantic excavation robot, the Detragiganto, which Descole commands and begins rampaging across the island in a desperate attempt to uncover Ambrosia by force. Layton and company escape the castle, and Layton and Luke fly in their makeshift helicopter to save Melina.

During the chaos, Melina tries to stop Descole, but he knocks her over the side of the robot, where she holds on for her life. Luke rescues Melina while Layton duels with Descole on top of the Detragiganto, and reveals that Descole had overlooked a third melody hidden in the seal, the Song of the Sun. Again, Melina sings as Layton takes the Detragon's controls, and this time, the ruins of Ambrosia do indeed rise, infuriating Descole even further. He lunges at Layton, believing that the ruins belong only to him, but merely damages the control panel instead, throwing the Detragiganto out of control and causing it to heavily damage itself. Descole falls off the machine and disappears while Layton, Luke and Melina escape.

In the aftermath of the rise of Ambrosia, Melina decides she cannot take over Janice's life, and, after bidding farewell to her father, Luke and Layton, her spirit leaves Janice's body. Whistler plays one last song on the remains of the Detragon, and Janice, now in control of her body again, sings for Melina's memory. As the sun rises over the island, Layton concludes that the true "eternal life" of the people of Ambrosia comes from people in the modern age still speaking tales of them and their beloved Queen. Luke wonders if Melina could have been a reincarnation of the queen of Ambrosia, and Layton reminds him of the legend: that Ambrosia would rise again when its beloved queen returned.

Voice cast

Home media
The film was released in Singapore on March 18, 2010, showing in Japanese with English and Chinese subtitles. Manga Entertainment UK has licensed the film for DVD and Blu-ray Disc release in the United Kingdom in October 2010. The Manga Entertainment release is dubbed by the voice actors used in the UK releases of the game, including several new voice actors, like Sarah Hadland and Wayne Forester. Several versions of the film have been released: a standard DVD release, a standard Blu-ray release, a three-disc DVD and Blu-ray combo pack, and a three-disc collector's edition that includes a 630-page book containing the complete storyboard.

When asked about a North American release, director Akihiro Hino said, "We don't have any plans to release the movies in America currently, but we'll make sure to let you know if that changes." Viz Media announced they had licensed the movie and released it on DVD in North America on November 8, 2011. The DVD was a direct port of the UK version and was not redubbed with the North American voice actors. The film was also released in German as Professor Layton und die ewige Diva and in the Netherlands as Professor Layton en de Eeuwige Diva.

Soundtracks

Two albums were released in Japan containing the music of the film. One titled The Eternal Diva: Janice Quatlane, containing all the vocal songs, and the other titled Layton Kyouju To Eien no Utahime Original Soundtrack, containing the main music from the film (most of which is reorchestrated versions of music from the first four games). Unlike the games, an actual orchestra was used for most of the music. In addition, the film's ending theme, The Eternal Diva, is included with its lyrics on both albums.

Reception
Professor Layton and the Eternal Diva debuted at number 6 at the Japanese box office, grossing $1,074,959 USD during its opening weekend. By the weekend of March 24 to the 26th, the film had grossed $6,140,049 in both Japanese and overseas (Taiwan and Singapore) totals. It was the ninth most watched anime film of the first of half of 2010 in Japan, and the 14th of the entire year.

GameSync.net gave it a positive review, calling it "wholeheartedly entertaining and heartwarming, with a dash of British wit and eccentricity." Martin Robinson of IGN gave the film a positive review stating, "It's not without faults; the climactic scene outstays its welcome, while the production levels don't match those of the top tier of anime. But it is disposable fun that's near certain to put a smile on your face - and that's something we've not been able to say about a video game adaptation for some time."

Possible sequel

The game series' developer and publisher Level-5 have stated that they wished to release a Professor Layton film every winter, and that they are already producing the next film. Besides the animated films, a British/Japanese live-action film was in the works as well. While not committing to a second film, director Akihiro Hino said that the "second season" of the Layton series (which begins with Professor Layton and the Last Specter) was originally imagined by another film.

References

Notes

External links
 Japanese official website
 Official UK site (archived)
 
 
 

2009 anime films
2000s mystery films
Anime films based on video games
Japanese mystery films
P.A.Works
Professor Layton
Films set in Kent
Films set in London
Films set on islands
Viz Media anime
Battle royale anime and manga
OLM, Inc. animated films
Toho animated films